Diablock is a census-designated place, unincorporated community and coal town in Perry County, Kentucky, United States. Its population was 453 as of the 2010 census. The town's post office  has closed.

Demographics

References

Census-designated places in Perry County, Kentucky
Census-designated places in Kentucky
Unincorporated communities in Kentucky
Coal towns in Kentucky
Unincorporated communities in Perry County, Kentucky